The 2020 1. deild was the 78th season of second-tier football in the Faroe Islands, and the 44th under the current format. Víkingur Gøta II won the league, but could not be promoted because the club already had a team in the Faroe Islands Premier League. 07 Vestur won promotion after the regular season. B68 Toftir which ended as 4th after the regular season played a promotion/relegation match against Argja Bóltfelag on 29 November 2020. B68 Toftir won the away match 2-3 with hat trick from Andri Benjaminsen, who is a young brother of record player of the Faroe Islands national football team Fróði Benjaminsen. The match ended 1-1 after 90 minutes, and after prolonged time B68 won with 3 goals against AB's 2 goals.

Teams

Skála ÍF II and EB/Streymur II were relegated last season to the 2. deild and replaced by the winners and runners-up FC Hoyvík and Argja Bóltfelag II respectively.

League table

Results
Each team plays three times (either twice at home and once away or once at home and twice away) against every other team for a total of 27 matches each.

Rounds 1–18

Rounds 19–27

See also
 2020 Faroe Islands Premier League
 2020 Faroe Islands Cup
 2020 2. deild

References

1. deild seasons
2
Faroe Islands Premier League